Phellodon indicus is a species of tooth fungus in the family Bankeraceae. Found in Himachal Pradesh, India, it was described as new to science in 1978.

References

External links

Fungi described in 1971
Fungi of India
Inedible fungi
indicus